Neches Independent School District is a public school district for students grades PK-12 based in the community of Neches, an unincorporated community in Anderson County, Texas (USA).  The district recently opened a new elementary/junior high in fall of 2010 

Located in east central Anderson County, the district has two schools:

Neches High School (Grades 9-12) 
Neches Elementary/Jr High School(Grades EE-8)

In 2009, the school district was rated "academically acceptable" by the Texas Education Agency.

References

External links

School districts in Anderson County, Texas